In optics the Lagrange invariant is a measure of the light propagating through an optical system. It is defined by
,

For a given optical system, the Lagrange invariant is a constant throughout all space, that is, it is invariant upon refraction and transfer.

The optical invariant is a generalization of the Lagrange invariant which is formed using the ray heights and angles of any two rays.  For these rays, the optical invariant is a constant throughout all space.

See also
 Etendue
 Smith-Helmholtz invariant
 Abbe sine condition

References

Geometrical optics